Berezovka is a rural locality (a settlement) in Verkh-Invenskoye Rural Settlement, Kudymkarsky District, Perm Krai, Russia. The population was 523 as of 2010. There are 14 streets.

Geography 
Berezovka is located 40 km southwest of Kudymkar (the district's administrative centre) by road. Samkovo is the nearest rural locality.

References 

Rural localities in Kudymkarsky District